Tsim Sha Tsui is an MTR station on the .

The two stations serve as an interchange point between the Tsuen Wan and Tuen Ma lines.

History
The station was built underneath Nathan Road in the late 1970s. The site of Exit A1 was once the vehicular entrance to Kowloon Park, which was relocated to Haiphong Road. The station opened on 16 December 1979 as part of the Modified Initial System. Service was extended southward, across the harbour, on 12 February 1980. Before the Tsuen Wan Extension opened, the single line of the MTR traveled from Central to Kwun Tong (whereas today all northbound trains from Tsim Sha Tsui go to Tsuen Wan). The station concourse was renovated in 1986.

Tsim Sha Tsui station was featured in Clifton Ko's 1987 film, It's a Mad, Mad, Mad World.It also appeared in the 1988 film Police Story 2,The Station appeared while spy's following a terrorist,The film also shows the stations interior. It also appeared in a brief chase sequence featuring Brigitte Lin in Wong Kar-wai's 1994 film, Chungking Express.

Modification work were undertaken from 2002 to 2005 to facilitate new pedestrian subway connections between this station and the new East Tsim Sha Tsui station, built nearby by the KCR Corporation. The contractor was Kumagai Gumi. The work involved reconfiguration of the concourse and various station upgrades.

Exit A1 was rebuilt from 2014 to 2016 to provide a new lift and enlarge the access. During construction a temporary exit was provided. The permanent exit reopened on 7 May 2016 with a "crystal cube" design, replacing the old concrete structure, that houses the lift, two escalators, and stairs.

In December 2013, construction began on a redesigned Exit D. A new passage was built to connect to the K11 shopping centre, aiming to relieve congestion in the southern end of the station concourse as well as the Mody Road Subway. The new passageway opened on 30 November 2018.

On 10 February 2017, a Tsuen Wan-bound train was the site of an arson attack in which 19 people were injured. A 60-year-old man suffering from mental illness shouted, "My son was killed. I shall burn with you all," and set himself ablaze in the packed train. He had a son from his first marriage, who had died in an incident. The train operator drove the train to Tsim Sha Tsui for evacuation. The station was closed after the incident and was reopened next morning. The suspect died from organ failure three months later and was the only casualty.

Station layout

 

Platforms 1 and 2 share the same island platform. Out-of-system access to the Tuen Ma line is provided at the concourse through exits F or G and a walk along the Middle Road or Mody Road subway system respectively to reach East Tsim Sha Tsui station.

Although Tsim Sha Tsui station and East Tsim Sha Tsui station are connected, the fare gates of these two station are separated. Single journey ticket passengers transferring from Tsuen Wan line to Tuen Ma line must purchase a second ticket at East Tsim Sha Tsui station as the first ticket is withdrawn, without refunding the remaining value in the ticket, once the passengers exit through the turnstiles at Tsim Sha Tsui station. In contrast, Octopus card users who transfer between Tsim Sha Tsui and East Tsim Sha Tsui stations within thirty minutes without making any other transport-related purchases or more than nine non-transport related purchases in between stations are considered to have taken a single journey and are charged accordingly. Also, MTR City Saver users who transfer between East Tsim Sha Tsui and Tsim Sha Tsui stations within thirty minutes are considered to have taken a single journey and are charged accordingly.

Entrances/exits
Tsim Sha Tsui station is linked with East Tsim Sha Tsui station through the Mody Road and Middle Road subways. Though the stations are independent from one another, they share a common exit naming scheme to avoid confusion.

There's no exits I or O because of the confusion with 1 and 0 respectively.

In Tsim Sha Tsui station
 A1: Kowloon Park 
 A2: Humphreys Avenue
 B1: Nathan Road
 B2: Cameron Road
 C1: Nathan Road 
 C2: Peking Road
 D1: Nathan Road
 D2: Carnarvon Road
 D3: K11 Art Mall
 E: Kowloon Hotel
 H: iSQUARE 
 R: iSQUARE

In East Tsim Sha Tsui station
 J: Victoria Dockside 
 K: Middle Road 
 L1: Hermes House
 L3: Peninsula Hotel 
 L4: Kowloon Hotel
 L5: Peking Road 
 L6: Salisbury Road 
 N1: Mody Road 
 N2: Hanoi Road
 N3: K11 Art Mall
 N4: K11 Art Mall
 N5: Nathan Road
 P1: Wing On Plaza 
 P2: Tsim Sha Tsui East 
 P3: Chatham Road South

References

External links
 

MTR stations in Kowloon
Tsuen Wan line
Tsim Sha Tsui
Railway stations in Hong Kong opened in 1979
1979 establishments in Hong Kong